Fluffy Stuff is a brand of cotton candy sold in a variety of fruit flavors, marketed by Tootsie Roll Industries, which acquired it in 2000. It is the largest producer of cotton candy in the United States. The candy is packed in moisture-resistant, airtight bags, to prevent moisture and airborne containments from spoiling the product. It is available in popular seasonal varieties, including Snow Balls (December), Cotton Tails (Easter), and Spider Webs (Halloween).

See also
 List of confectionery brands

References

External links
 Official web site

Tootsie Roll Industries brands
Candy